Eoconus veteratoris is an extinct species of sea snail, a marine gastropod mollusk, in the family Conidae.

Distribution
Fossils of this species were found in Eocene strata in the Paris basin, France.

References

veteratoris
Gastropods described in 2017